SVP may refer to:

Science and mathematics
 Shortest vector problem, the problem of finding the smallest non-zero vector in a lattice space
 Society of Vertebrate Paleontology, a society of paleontologists
 Saturated vapour pressure, the pressure exerted by a vapour in thermodynamic equilibrium with its condensed phases at a given temperature in a closed system.
 Small volume parenterals, a type of injectable pharmaceutical product

Politics and law
 Party of the Swedes (Svenskarnas parti), a former neo-Nazi political party in Sweden
 Swiss People's Party (Schweizerische Volkspartei), a national-conservative political party in Switzerland
 South Tyrolean People's Party (Südtiroler Volkspartei), a regionalist and autonomist political party in German-speaking South Tyrol, Italy
 Sexually violent predator, a US legal classification allowing commitment to a mental institution

Entertainment
 Save percentage, a goalkeeping statistic used by some sports leagues
 Sega Virtua Processor, a processor added to the Sega Genesis game Virtua Racing
 Struga Poetry Evenings (Struški Večeri na Poezijata), an international poetry festival held in Struga, North Macedonia
 Scott Van Pelt (born 1966), American sportscaster

Other
 SVP Worldwide, producer of sewing machines
 Society of Saint Vincent de Paul, a Roman Catholic charity
 Senior vice president, in the hierarchy of vice presidents
 Soil vent pipe, in a drain-waste-vent system
 SmoothVideo Project, motion interpolation software